Lance B. Becker is an American physician and academic, specializing in emergency medicine and treatment for cardiac arrest, currently at Northwell Health. He is the chairman of the department of emergency medicine at North Shore University Hospital, as well as chair and professor of emergency medicine at Hofstra Northwell School of Medicine.

Career
Becker received his M.D. from the University of Illinois College of Medicine, and completed his residency in internal medicine at the Michael Reese Hospital and Medical Center. Prior to joining Northwell, he founded and directed of the Center for Resuscitation Science at the University of Pennsylvania, and the Emergency Resuscitation Center at the University of Chicago.

Research

Becker is the author and co-author of more than 290 scientific publications. His research has been focused on extending the time between cardiac arrest, or clinical death, and the time when a person is brain dead and can no longer be revived by emergency care. Historically, there was a "standard four-minute time limit", but this can now be extended to fifteen or even thirty minutes through better medical practices. Becker has worked to convince other doctors that "death doesn’t mean what they learned in their med school textbooks: 10 minutes without oxygen equals gone".

Becker discovered that re-introduction of oxygen, rather than loss of oxygen, was primarily responsible for cell death. Cell death can be delayed or stopped through the application of therapeutic hypothermia. In the case of Swedish skier Anna Bågenholm, who fell through ice into freezing water, the cold protected her from brain damage despite being without oxygen for over an hour.

As of 2014, further research is planned where a patient's blood is replaced with a cold saline solution, and a state of "profound hypothermia" is then medically induced, at temperatures as low as 50 F (10 C). According to Becker, "draining the blood out and rapidly cooling a person to a deep level—we try to do it every day, and it’s just doggone hard to do... But I would say it’s very likely that the idea is correct." Becker believes that long-term suspended animation, where a person is kept cold for years, will eventually be possible, although "we’re quite a distance" from that with current technology.

Becker leads the MTV-CPR (Mechanical, Team-Focused, Video-Reviewed Cardiopulmonary Resuscitation) project, based on video-feedback of cardiopulmonary resuscitation cases at the North Shore University Hospital. In 2020 Becker's team published a 2-year study showing improvements in return of spontaneous circulation in cardiac arrest patients from 26% to 41% in non-intervention vs intervention groups, respectively. Becker and Miyara published the first case report of a transplant renal artery pseudoaneurysm  that due to retroperitoneal bleeding caused uretero-vesical anastomosis dehiscence, hematuria, hemorrhagic shock, pulmonary embolism and cardiac arrest. This is the first known survivor who presented those clinical and pathological characteristics.

Awards
Becker is a member of the US National Academy of Sciences, as well as the National Academy of Medicine.

References

External links
 Personal page at Hofstra School of Medicine

Year of birth missing (living people)
Living people
American emergency physicians
Hofstra University faculty
Northwell Health
Members of the National Academy of Medicine
Members of the United States National Academy of Sciences
University of Illinois College of Medicine alumni